Yuen Kong Chau may refer to
Yuen Kong Chau, Sai Kung District, Hong Kong
Yuen Kong Chau, Islands District, Hong Kong